The quad singles wheelchair tennis competition at the 2008 Summer Paralympics in Beijing was held from 9 September to 14 September at the Olympic Green Tennis Centre. The DecoTurf surface rendered the event a hardcourt competition.

Medalists

Calendar

Seeds

Draw

Key 

 INV = Bipartite invitation
 IP = ITF place
 ALT = Alternate

 r = Retired
 w/o = Walkover

Finals

Top half

Bottom half

References 
 

Quad singles